"Not Letting Go" is a song by British rapper Tinie Tempah. It features the vocals from British singer Jess Glynne. The song was released as a digital download in the United Kingdom on 21 June 2015 as the lead single for his third studio album Youth. It also appears on the deluxe version of Glynne's debut album, I Cry When I Laugh (2015). "Not Letting Go" samples the song "Not for Long" by American rapper B.o.B. and also contains a sample from "There's a Better Way" from Jermaine Jackson's 1982 album "Let Me Tickle Your Fancy".

The song entered at the top of the UK Singles Chart, giving Tempah his sixth UK chart-topper (more than any other artist during the 2010s) and Glynne her fourth. Tempah overtook Dizzee Rascal for most number-one singles by a British rap artist.

Background
Talking to Digital Spy, Tinie Tempah said, "I've been a fan of Jess since I heard her song 'Home'. We met properly at the Brits last year and spoke about doing something together. We both had crazy summers and kept bumping into each other at festivals. We eventually set a date for studio with Bless Beats, who produced the track, and it just kind of happened." He also said "Both being Londoners, I wanted to make a song that captured that London summertime feeling which is always the best time of the year for me and the time where I've had my most romantic experience. So it's an ode to a girl I met and our experiences in this amazing city we call home – London!"

Accolades
The song finished the year as the 36th-best-selling song of 2015 in the United Kingdom.

Music video
The music video was directed by Charlie Robins and Joe Alexander. It features both Tempah and Glynne, and was shot in Brockwell Park, Brixton, South London.

Track listing

Live performances
Tempah performed the song with Sasha Keable on The Graham Norton Show, as Glynne was having surgery on her vocal chords.

Charts and certifications

Weekly charts

Year-end charts

Certifications

Release history

References

2015 singles
2015 songs
Tinie Tempah songs
Jess Glynne songs
UK Singles Chart number-one singles
Songs written by Tinie Tempah
Parlophone singles
Songs written by Jermaine Jackson (hip hop producer)
Songs written by Jess Glynne
Songs written by Jin Jin (musician)